The Australian Commercial Radio Awards (ACRAs), previously known as the rAWARDS, are an Australian award ceremony held to recognise outstanding achievements in the radio industry. They were first held in 1989, and recognise excellence in all areas of Australian radio broadcasting including news, talk, sport, music and entertainment. They are run annually by Commercial Radio Australia and hosted in either Sydney, Melbourne, Brisbane or the Gold Coast.

There are typically 33 award categories that are peer judged across three divisions: metropolitan, provincial and country commercial radio stations.  All judging panels are composed of industry members.

Awards Format 
The awards are organised into various categories, with nominees being announced a few weeks before the main awards ceremony.  Usually four (on rare occasions five) entries are shortlisted in each of the three divisions and an overall division winner is selected from these finalists, meaning three separate awards are given out per category (one each for metropolitan, provincial and country). A hall of fame member is also generally inducted each year.

The night is hosted by an industry member (or members), who is (are) generally employed in an on-air capacity, with revolving hosts throughout the night presenting specific awards.

Previous Winners 
A full list of winners can be found on the Australian Commercial Radio Awards website. All winners listed below are in the Metropolitan division.

References

External links 
 Official site
 Commercial Radio Australia

Australian awards
Radio awards
Awards established in 1989